Jennifer Bernet (born August 21, 1962) is an American social worker and Democratic politician who was a member of the New Hampshire House of Representatives. First elected in 2006, she failed to retake the seat in 2008 and 2010. In 2011, when Bob Mead resigned to be chief of staff to Speaker Bill O'Brien, Bernet handily won a special election to take his place. Following redistricting in 2012, she again lost reelection and ran in 2014 for a seat on the Executive Council of New Hampshire. She returned to the House in 2018 and served until 2020.

References

External links
 Jennifer Bernet at the New Hampshire General Court

Democratic Party members of the New Hampshire House of Representatives
1962 births
Living people
Antioch University alumni
State University of New York at Oneonta alumni
University of New Hampshire alumni
Women state legislators in New Hampshire
21st-century American politicians
21st-century American women politicians